Events in the year 2004 in Bulgaria.

Incumbents 

 President: Georgi Parvanov
 Prime Minister: Simeon Sakskoburggotski

Events 

 29 March – Bulgaria is admitted to NATO.

References 

 
2000s in Bulgaria
Years of the 21st century in Bulgaria
Bulgaria
Bulgaria